Anatea monteithi is a species of comb-footed spider in the family Theridiidae. It is found in Queensland.

References

Theridiidae
Spiders described in 2017
Spiders of Australia